David Meves (born July 20, 1990) is an American professional soccer player who plays as a goalkeeper, most recently for Puerto Rico FC of the North American Soccer League.

Career

College and Youth
Meves played four years of college soccer at the University of Akron between 2009 and 2012.

While at college, Meves also appeared for USL PDL club Chicago Fire Premier from 2010 to 2012.

Professional
On January 22, 2013 Meves was selected 3rd overall in the 2013 MLS Supplemental Draft by Portland Timbers. Meves wasn't signed by Portland and spent time with Portland Timbers U23s in 2013.

Meves played with USL PDL club Des Moines Menace in 2014, before signing with North American Soccer League club Fort Lauderdale Strikers on July 10, 2014. Meves earned the starting job for the Strikers in 2015 before being sidelined by a broken jaw.

Meves joined NASL expansion team Puerto Rico FC on March 10, 2016.

Meves was released by Puerto Rico at the end of their 2016 season.

References

External links 
 Fort Lauderdale Strikers Profile.

1990 births
Living people
American soccer players
Akron Zips men's soccer players
Association football goalkeepers
Chicago Fire U-23 players
Des Moines Menace players
Fort Lauderdale Strikers players
North American Soccer League players
People from Arlington Heights, Illinois
Portland Timbers draft picks
Portland Timbers U23s players
Puerto Rico FC players
Soccer players from Illinois
Sportspeople from Cook County, Illinois
USL League Two players